Leonard J. Fein (July 1, 1934 – August 14, 2014), also known as Leibel Fein, was an American activist, writer, and teacher specializing in Jewish social themes.

Academic career
After studying at the University of Chicago, Fein later received his PhD from Michigan State University.

Fein taught Political Science at MIT in the 1960s. He was then also the Deputy Director of the MIT/Harvard Joint Center for Urban Studies. He joined the Brandeis University faculty in 1970 as a Professor of Politics and Social Policy and the Klutznick Professor of Contemporary Jewish Studies.

Jewish community leader
He founded the National Jewish Coalition for Literacy and was co-founder and for 12 years editor of Moment Magazine. He was characterized by Daniel Sokatch of the New Israel Fund as "the father of our Jewish social justice movement."

Fein is the founder of MAZON: A Jewish Response to Hunger, a Jewish hunger-relief organization started in 1985.

Fein helped establish Americans for Peace Now.

Author
He was the author of four books and the editor of two, and he wrote extensively for newspapers, magazines, and journals. From 1990, he wrote a syndicated weekly opinion column for The Forward newspaper.

Fein's books include Where Are We? The Inner Life of America’s Jews and Israel: Politics and People. He was a contributor to The New York Times, The New Republic, Commentary, Commonweal, The Nation, Dissent, and the Los Angeles Times.

Family
His father was a professor of Jewish history.

He was the brother of Rashi Fein, Litt. D., Ph.D., a famed health economist termed "a father of Medicare" and Professor of Economics of Medicine, Emeritus, in the Department of Global Health and Social Medicine at Harvard Medical School.

He was married twice and had three daughters, Rachel, Nomi, and Jessie.

Death
Fein died at the age of 80.

Awards
 Ameinu Dreamers and Builders Award, November 2009.
 Honorary doctorate from the Hebrew Union College, 1991
 National Foundation for Jewish Culture award for achievement in Jewish scholarship, 1994.
 Jewish Council on Public Affairs, Chernin Award for lifetime contributions to social justice, 1999.
 University of Chicago Alumni Award for "creative leadership in public service that has benefited society and reflected credit on the University", 2000.

References

External links
 Leonard Fein Papers at the American Jewish Historical Society at the Center for Jewish History
 Behavior: Two Voices: A Dialogue on Dissension. Time, January 31, 1969. Fein and educator Rhody McCoy are interviewed on the relationships between ethnic communities.

American magazine editors
Writers from Brooklyn
Jewish American community activists
Jewish American academics
University of Chicago alumni
Michigan State University alumni
MIT School of Humanities, Arts, and Social Sciences faculty
Brandeis University faculty
1934 births
2014 deaths